Takyarlu may refer to:
 Artavaz, Armenia
 Tsakhkashen, Aragatsotn, Armenia